Matija Boben (born 26 February 1994) is a Slovenian football player. He plays as a centre-back for Italian  club Pescara on loan from Ternana.

Club career
He made his professional debut in the Slovenian PrvaLiga in the 2013–14 season for NK Triglav Kranj.

On 4 July 2017, he signed a three-year contract with a one-year-extension option with the Russian Premier League club FC Rostov.

On 28 January 2019, he joined Italian club Livorno on loan until the end of the 2018–19 season. On 28 June 2019, Rostov and Livorno agreed on a permanent transfer.

On 5 October 2020, he went to Ternana on loan.

On 8 July 2021, he moved to Ternana on a permanent basis and signed a three-year contract. On 3 August 2022, Boben was loaned to Pescara.

Career statistics

Club

References

External links
 PrvaLiga profile 
 

1994 births
Footballers from Ljubljana
Living people
Slovenian footballers
Slovenia youth international footballers
Slovenia international footballers
Association football defenders
NK Triglav Kranj players
Slovenian PrvaLiga players
NK Ivančna Gorica players
Bolton Wanderers F.C. players
Slovenian expatriate footballers
Slovenian expatriate sportspeople in England
Expatriate footballers in England
ND Gorica players
FC Rostov players
U.S. Livorno 1915 players
Ternana Calcio players
Delfino Pescara 1936 players
Expatriate footballers in Russia
Slovenian expatriate sportspeople in Russia
Russian Premier League players
Expatriate footballers in Italy
Slovenian expatriate sportspeople in Italy
Serie B players
Serie C players